Kitty Hawk or Kittyhawk may refer to:

Places
 Kitty Hawk, North Carolina, where the Wright Brothers flew their first controlled flight in 1903
 Kitty Hawk, an area of Wright-Patterson Air Force Base in Ohio, USA

Airplane and air transport
 Kitty Hawk (airplane), commonly known as the Wright Flyer
 Kitty Hawk Aircargo, an American cargo airline
 Kitty Hawk Airways, an American airline
 Kitty Hawk Corporation, a Silicon Valley "flying car" start-up
 "Kittyhawk" one of the call signs used by flights carrying members of the royal family 
 "Kittyhawk", the name that the British gave to the advanced variants of the American Curtiss P-40 fighter plane

Military
 USS Kitty Hawk, a ship of the United States Navy
 KITTYHAWK, the airline code for military United Kingdom Royal VIP Flights
 Kitty Hawk Air Society, an Honor Society for the Air Force Junior Reserve Officers' Training Corps program
 Camp Kitty Hawk (renamed Camp Bonifas), a United Nations military post south of the Korean Demilitarized Zone

Computers
 IBM Kittyhawk, a 2008 supercomputer designed by IBM to run the entire Internet
 HP Kittyhawk microdrive, a hard disk drive made by Hewlett Packard

Other
 Kittyhawk (band), an emo band from Chicago, Illinois
 Kitty Hawk Middle School, in the Judson Independent School District, Universal City, Texas
 Kittyhawk, the call sign of the command module of the Apollo 14 spacecraft
 Kittyhawk, the creator of Sparkling Generation Valkyrie Yuuki
 Kitty Hawks, American interior designer